Isaac Craite (April 1856 – February 23, 1918) was a Wisconsin businessman, judge, and legislator.

Born in Manitowoc Rapids, Wisconsin, Craite taught school and became a justice of the peace. Craite became a merchant and was elected to the municipal court in Manitowoc, Wisconsin. During this time, he studied the law, was admitted to the state bar and practiced law. In 1887 and 1889, Craite was elected to the Wisconsin State Assembly.

References

People from Manitowoc, Wisconsin
Wisconsin state court judges
Members of the Wisconsin State Assembly
1856 births
1918 deaths
19th-century American judges